Antoine Pellegrina (born 21 September 1933) is a French former cyclist. He competed in the sprint event at the 1960 Summer Olympics.

References

External links
 

1933 births
Living people
French male cyclists
Olympic cyclists of France
Cyclists at the 1960 Summer Olympics
Cyclists from Friuli Venezia Giulia
People from the Province of Udine